Iran participated in the 1951 Asian Games held in the capital city of New Delhi, India from March 4, 1951 to March 11, 1951. This country is ranked 3rd with 8 gold medals in this edition of the Asiad. Ahmad Ordoubadi was the flagbearer for Iran in the opening ceremony.

Competitors

Medal summary

Medal table

Medalists

Results by event

Aquatics

Diving

Men

Swimming

Men

Athletics

Men

Basketball

Men

Cycling

Road
Men

Track

Men

Football

Men

Weightlifting

Men

References

External links
  Iran Olympic Committee - Asian Games Medalists
  Iran National Sports Organization - Asian Games Medalists
  Pars Sport

Nations at the 1951 Asian Games
1951
Asian Games